Rhodesia United Air Carriers (RUAC) was a company formed in 1957 by the amalgamation of several existing charter companies; Air Carriers Limited and Flights (1956) Limited of Salisbury, and Fishair of Victoria Falls.  Commercial Air Services (Rhodesia) of Bulawayo was integrated into RUAC in August 1960, following the merger of its holding company, Airwork Ltd (also known as Airwork Services), with Hunting-Clan (which had owned Air Carriers Ltd), a subsidiary of the maritime company Clan Line.

RUAC was the Beechcraft agent for Central Africa. It operated a fleet of Beech Barons, a Beech Queen Air, several Piper Apache and Aztec aircraft, a Cessna 180 and a Britten-Norman BN-2 Islander.

The company had bases at Salisbury (head office and maintenance base), Bulawayo and Victoria Falls.

Airlines established in 1957
Airlines of Rhodesia
1957 establishments in the Federation of Rhodesia and Nyasaland